Ladakh is an administrative territory of India that has been under its control since 1947. The geographical region of Ladakh union territory is the highest altitude plateau region in India (much of it being over 3,000 m), incorporating parts of the Himalayan and Karakoram mountain ranges and the upper Indus River and valley.

Political geography

Historic Ladakh consists of a number of distinct areas (mainly under Indian rule), including the fairly populous main Indus valley, the more remote Zanskar (in the south) and Nubra valleys (to the north over Khardung La in the Ladakh mountain range, a high motorable pass at ), the almost deserted Aksai Chin (under Chinese rule) and the predominantly Shi'ite Muslim Kargil and Suru valley areas in the west (Kargil being the second most important town in Ladakh). Historically populated by the Ladakhi people, continued immigration and preferential treatment to Kashmiris by the J&K government have led to demographic changes in the Ladakh region.

The Baltistan and Skardu area, under Pakistani rule and entirely Muslim, used to be included in what is geographically referred to as Ladakh. Before partition, Baltistan was one of the districts of Ladakh. Skardo was the winter capital of Ladakh while Leh was the summer capital. People of Baltistan and Ladakh speak very similar languages closely related to Tibetan.

Naked barley (Urdu: grim), normal barley and wheat are the staple crops all over Ladakh, along with mustard (for oil), lentils and other pulses, and vegetables. The extreme limit of cultivation is at Korzok near the Tso Moriri lake, at 4560 m, said to be among the highest fields in the world.

Mountain ranges 

The mountain ranges in this region were formed over a period of 45 million years by the folding of the Indian Plate into the stationary landmass of Asia. Himalayas were formed from the base material of the Indian plate.

Ladakh range 

The Ladakh Range has no major peaks; its average height is a little less than 6000 metres, and few of its passes are less than 5000 m. Within Ladakh it forms the northern boundary wall of the Indus valley, though when the river enters present-day Indian-controlled Ladakh at Demchok, some 250 km south-east of Leh, it is actually flowing along the foot of the northern flank of these granite mountains, which it crosses by a great gorge close to its confluence with the Hanle River.

The Pangong Range runs parallel to the Ladakh range for some 100 km northwest from Chushul, and extends to the south along the southern shore of the Panggong Lake. It is divided from the main Ladakh range by the Tangtse River. Its highest range is 6700 m, and the northern slopes are heavily glaciated.

A third branch called the Kailash Range issues south from the Pangong Range and continues till Mount Kailas in Ngari (in Tibet). It forms the eastern watershed of the Indus River south of Mount Sajum.

Zanskar range 

The Zanskar Range consists of layers of sediment from the ocean floor, and the Ladakh Range of granite was born of the immense heat generated by the friction between the two plates. In Ladakh, the suture zone between the continental masses runs a little to the south of the Indus Valley. The drift continues and is the cause of the frequent earthquakes in the Himalayan region. Crossing the Himalayas by the dip of the Zoji-la, the crest-line of the range remains at a relatively modest level, the highest peaks near the pass being little more than 5000–5500 m above sea level. South-east of Zoji-la the scale increases, reaching a climax in the mighty massif of Nun-Kun, with two summits over 7000 m.

Rivers and valleys 

The enormous mass of the Himalayas creates a rain shadow, denying entry to the moisture-laden clouds of the Indian monsoon. Ladakh is thus a high altitude desert. The main source of water is the winter snowfall on the mountains. The regions on the north flank of the Himalayas—Dras, the Suru valley and Zanskar—experience heavy snowfall and remain virtually cut off from the rest of the country for several months in the year. Summers are short, although long enough to grow crops. The proportion of oxygen is less than in many other places at a comparable altitude because of lack of vegetation. There is little moisture to temper the effects of rarefied air.

Suru and Zanskar valleys form a great trough at the foot of the northern, heavily glaciated flank of the Himalayas, while opposite rise the mountains of the Zanskar range.

Indus river and valley 

Indus River is the backbone of Ladakh;  all the major places historically and currently such as Shey, Leh, Basgo, and Tingmosgang are situated close to the river.

Zanskar river and valley 

Zanskar valley consists of troughs of two rivers, the Stod (Doda) and the Lungnak (Tsarap Lingti). One of the Lungnak's main tributaries is the Tsarap, which drains portions of northeastern Himachal Pradesh and valleys just 20 kilometers northwest of Tso Moriri (lake). A little away north of Bara-lacha-la it is joined by the Lingti and another tributary; it then flows north-west before turning abruptly south through a gorge and past Phugtal Gompa to join the Kargyak river descending from Shingo-la, that goes into Himachal Pradesh. The Stod carries meltwater of the Drang-drung glacier below the Pensi-la, and flows down a broad open valley, approaching the Lungnak. As the Zangskar river, their united waters flow northwards through a gorge in the Zanskar range, to join the Indus at Nyemo in Central Ladakh. Zanskar suffers heavy snowfall, and the Pensi-la opens only in June and is blocked again in mid-October. The entire valley is virtually treeless.

Shyok river and valley 

Shyok River rises near the Karakoram Pass. The region comprising the valley of Shyok and Nubra Rivers is known as Nubra. The Karakoram Range in Ladakh is not as mighty as in Baltistan. The massifs to the north and east of the Nubra-Siachen valley include the Apsarasas group (highest point 7245 m), the Rimo group (highest point 7385 m) and the Teram Kangri group (highest point 7464 m), together with Mamostong Kangri (7526 m) and Singhi Kangri (7202 m.)  North of the Karakoram lie the Kun Lun Mountains. Thus, between Leh and eastern Central Asia, there is a triple barrier:  the Ladakh Range, the Karakoram range, and the Kun Lun. Nevertheless, a major trade route was established between Leh and Yarkand.

Suru river and valley 

Suru River forms the western and northern boundary of the Zanskar range. The Suru, after receiving the combined waters of the Dras and Shingo Rivers a short distance north of Kargil, joins the Indus at Marol in Baltistan, which is now on the Pakistan side of the Line of Control. Rangdum Monastery and the attendant village of Julidok is the last inhabited region in the Suru valley; it is also the destination of the nomadic herdspeople called Bakarwals, who trek up every summer from the Jammu region. From Rangdum the valley rises to 4400 metres at the Pensi-la, the gateway into Zanskar. Kargil, the only town in the Suru valley, was an important staging post on the routes of the trade caravans before 1947, being more or less equidistant, at about 230 kilometres from Srinagar, Leh, Skardo, and Padum. Rangdum, though on the northern side of the Pensi-la, is regarded as socially and culturally part of Zangskar rather than of Suru.

Gallery

See also
 Geology of the Himalaya 
 Indus-Yarlung suture zone
 List of districts of Ladakh
 Siachen Glacier

References

External links

Picture galleries: Monasteries, mountains and people

 
Plateaus of India